Cabrera is a town in María Trinidad Sánchez province, Dominican Republic. It is located at the eastern end of the country's north coast, at the western extreme of the Scottish Bay, 130 kilometers north of Santo Domingo.

The town was originally named 'Tres Amarras', the name it used to be called since its foundation day on July 1, 1891. The city was renamed to 'Cabrera' in honor of the hero of the Capotillo Battle, General José Cabrera.  Today Cabrera has a territorial area of 276 km². With a population of over 39,000, Cabrera unlike most towns located on the coasts does not depend so much on tourism. Cabrera’s main source of income is cattle, meat, and milk. In the agricultural aspect, production of coconuts and rice are noticeable sources as well.

Located facing the Atlantic, Cabrera has beaches, rivers, exotic vegetation and other natural features and attractions. A National Park reserve is located in El Breton, a small section of Cabrera called Cabo Francés Viejo (Cape Old Frenchman).

Cabrera’s mainstream religion is the Christian Evangelic Church; this is not true for most towns in the island since Catholicism is the official religion in the Dominican Republic.  However, Cabrera has a prominent and recently renovated Catholic church located in the city center.

Local beaches include El Diamante (Diamond Beach), Playa La Entrada, El Caleton de Dario, El Caleton del Medio, and El Caleton Chiquito.

Climate

People
Guillermo Linares, born in Cabrera, is a former NYC council man and current Commissioner of the Mayor’s Office of Immigrant Affairs (MOIA) Jorge Cavoli, also born in Cabrera, has been mayor of Cabrera for two terms.
El Prodigio, Krency Garcia. Famous accordion musician, Juan Alcequiez, better known as Juancito. He has been a stage-manager for 16 years. He is a gentle person that contributes to the citizens.

References

Populated places in María Trinidad Sánchez Province
Municipalities of the Dominican Republic